Stefannie Arissa Koyama (born 30 June 1995) is a Japanese-born Brazilian judoka. Koyama had won bronze at the All-Japan Judo Championships at Fukuoka in 2016, followed by the East Asian title at 2016 East Asian Judo Championships at Hong Kong. While representing Japan, Koyama's teamed with Funa Tonaki at Teikyo University but later switched to Brazil in 2017.

She is the gold medallist of the 2017 Judo Grand Prix Tbilisi and the 2017 Judo Grand Slam Baku in the -48 kg category.

References

External links
 

1995 births
Living people
Sportspeople from Gunma Prefecture
Japanese female judoka
Brazilian female judoka
Japanese emigrants to Brazil